Henri Wernli (3 June 1898 – 3 June 1961) was a Swiss freestyle wrestler and Olympic medalist. Wernli won a gold medal at the 1924 Summer Olympics in Paris, France. Wernli also competed at the 1928 Summer Olympics in Amsterdam, Netherlands.

References

External links

1898 births
1961 deaths
Swiss wrestlers
Wrestlers at the 1924 Summer Olympics
Wrestlers at the 1928 Summer Olympics
Swiss male sport wrestlers
Olympic silver medalists for Switzerland
Olympic medalists in wrestling
Medalists at the 1924 Summer Olympics
Sportspeople from Bern